Tuvalu was represented by Okilani Tinilau at the 2013 World Championships in Athletics in Moscow, Russia, from 10–18 August 2013. He competed in the 100 metres sprint and achieved a time of 11.57 seconds in the heats and did not proceed to the semi-finals.

References

External links
IAAF World Championships – Tuvalu

Nations at the 2013 World Championships in Athletics
World Championships in Athletics
2013